Sulzfeld is a municipality  in the district of Rhön-Grabfeld in Bavaria in Germany.  It contains the following villages: Kleinbardorf, Leinach, Sulzfeld, Sulzfelder Forst.  The large regional Jewish cemetery, Jewish Cemetery (Kleinbardorf) is also located in the municipality.

References

Rhön-Grabfeld